Irasema Dilián (born Eva Irasema Warschalowska; May 27, 1924 – April 16, 1996) was an actress. Born in Brazil to Polish parents, she began her film career in Italy, and appeared in Italian, Spanish and Mexican films.

Biography
Irasema Dilián was born in Rio de Janeiro, Brazil, to Polish parents. She began her film career in Italy, having appeared in Vittorio de Sica's Maddalena, Zero for Conduct. Over the next few years she worked for de Sica, Riccardo Freda, and Mario Soldati, together with actors like Alida Valli and Rossano Brazzi.

She appeared in four Spanish films between the years 1946 and 1949 before moving to Mexico and making her debut in Girls in Uniform (1951), a remake of the 1931 German picture Mädchen in Uniform. In 1952, Dilián was nominated for an Ariel Award for Stolen Paradise. Over the next several years, Dilián starred in a number of important films with such major stars as Arturo de Córdova, Pedro Armendáriz and Pedro Infante, and played the leading female role in Luis Buñuel's Wuthering Heights (1954).

Some of her Mexican films were scripted by her Italian husband, Dino Maiuri. Dilián's last Mexican-made film was Pablo and Carolina (1957), though she did appear in several co-productions in 1956. In 1958, she appeared in her last Spanish-speaking film.

Filmography 

Maddalena, Zero for Conduct (1940)
La Comédie du bonheur (1940)
Schoolgirl Diary (1941)
Teresa Venerdì (1941)
I Sette peccati (1942)
Violette nei capelli (1942)
La Principessa del sogno (1942)
Malombra (1942)
 Music on the Run (1943)
Cero en conducta (1945)
Black Eagle (1946)
Un Drama nuevo (1946)
Cuando llegue la noche (1946)
The Captain's Daughter (1947)
The Courier of the King (1947)
39 cartas de amor (1949)
Women Without Names (1950)
I'm in the Revue (1950)
 The Merry Widower (1950)
Born of Unknown Father (1950)
 Girls in Uniform (1951)
Stolen Paradise (1951)
Angélica (1952)
La Mujer que tu quieres (1952)
The Coward (1953)
Forbidden Fruit (1953)
The Unfaithful (1953)
Dos mundos y un amor (1954)
Wuthering Heights (1954)
Un Minuto de bondad (1954)
La Desconocida (1954)
Historia de un abrigo de mink (1955)
Primavera en el corazón (1956)
Y si ella volviera (1957)
Pablo and Carolina (1957)
La Estrella del rey (1957)
La Muralla (1958)

References

External links
 
Cine Mexicano
Biographical Dictionary of Mexican Film Performers

Brazilian people of Polish descent
Brazilian expatriates in Mexico
1924 births
1996 deaths
20th-century Brazilian actresses
Golden Age of Mexican cinema